Gun laws in Massachusetts regulate the sale, possession, and use of firearms and ammunition in the Commonwealth of Massachusetts in the United States. These laws are among the most restrictive in the entire country.

Summary table

Licensing process
Massachusetts law requires firearm owners to be licensed through their local Police Department or the Massachusetts State Police if no local licensing authority is available. A license is required by state law for buying firearms and ammunition. An applicant must have passed a State approved firearm safety course before applying for a license.

All applications, interviews, fees, and fingerprinting are done at the local Police Department then sent electronically to the Massachusetts Criminal History Board for the mandatory background checks and processing. All approved applicants will receive their license from the issuing Police Department. All licensing information is stored by the Criminal History Board. Non-residents who are planning on carrying in the state must apply for a temporary license to carry (LTC) through the State Police before their travel.

Mandatory reporting of transfers
All Massachusetts residents who sell, transfer, inherit, or lose a firearm are required to report the sale, transfer, inheritance, or loss of the firearms to the Department of Criminal Justice Information Services Firearms Records Bureau by filing a FA-10 form.

Types of firearm licenses
As of January 1, 2015, Massachusetts will no longer issue A and B Licenses to Carry, there will be just a single LTC which is identical to the old LTC-A. An LTC is required to carry a pistol both openly or concealed in Massachusetts. 

FID (Firearms Identification Card): Permits the purchase of rifles and shotguns with a capacity of no more than 10 rounds and their carrying for hunting and sporting purposes. FIDs are "Shall issue," except if the applicant fails a background check or is deemed "unsuitable" by the Police Chief.
LTC-A: This license allows purchase any firearm legal in the Commonwealth of Massachusetts, are authorized to own "large capacity" firearms holding greater than 10 rounds assuming the magazine is "pre-ban" (Manufactured prior to September 13, 1994) post ban high-capacity magazines are not legal in Massachusetts with the exception of Law Enforcement. An LTC-A is the only permit that allows concealed carry in Massachusetts assuming it has not had any restrictions placed on it by the Chief of Police or issuing authority. 

"Machine gun" license: A machine gun license, granted on a may-issue basis, is required to purchase/possess a machine gun.  Issuance is at the discretion of the police chief of the city or town, and criteria vary widely. Machine gun licenses are generally only issued to collectors (C&R FFL holders) and police instructors.

Additionally, LTC permits may have the following restrictions, however, none of these restrictions have been clearly defined by state law, and are subject to each Chief of Police's definition of such.  Violation of the restrictions imposed by the licensing authority shall be cause for suspension or revocation of the license and a fine of $1,000 to $10,000.

Employment: restricts possession to business owner engaged in business activities or to an employee while engaged in work-related activities, and maintaining proficiency, where the employer requires the carry of a firearm (i.e. armored car, security guard, etc.). Includes travel to and from activity location. 
Target and hunting: (Most Common restriction)– restricts possession to the purpose of lawful recreational shooting or competition; for use in the lawful pursuit of game animals and birds; for personal protection in the home; and for the purpose of collecting (other than machine guns). Includes travel to and from activity location 
Sporting: restricts possession to the purpose of lawful recreational shooting or competition; for use in the lawful pursuit of game animals and birds; for personal protection in the home; for the purpose of collecting (other than machine guns); and for outdoor recreational activities such as hiking, camping, cross-country skiing, or similar activities. Includes travel to and from activity location. 
Other: (Very Rare) Issuing Chief has special reason or direction for the restriction of the permit. Can vary greatly.

Assault weapons
Assault weapons are defined (with no exceptions, except pre 1994 models) as: (i) Avtomat Kalashnikov (AK) (all models), Action Arms Israeli Military Industries UZI and Galil, Beretta Ar70 (SC-70), Colt AR-15, Fabrique National FN/FAL, FN/LAR and FNC, SWD M-10, M-11, M-11/9 and M-12, Steyr AUG, INTRATEC TEC-9, TEC-DC9, TEC-22, revolving cylinder shotguns, Street Sweeper, and the Striker 12.

Assault weapons are also defined as:
A semiautomatic, centerfire rifle that has the capacity to accept a detachable magazine and any two of the following:
A pistol grip that protrudes conspicuously beneath the action of the weapon.
A folding or telescoping stock.
A grenade launcher or flare launcher.
A flash suppressor or threaded barrel designed to accommodate a flash suppressor; 
A bayonet lug
A semiautomatic pistol that has the capacity to accept a detachable magazine and any two of the following:
A threaded barrel, capable of accepting a flash suppressor
A second handgrip.
A shroud that is attached to, or partially or completely encircles, the barrel that allows the bearer to fire the weapon without burning his or her hand, except a slide              that encloses the barrel.
The capacity to accept a detachable magazine at some location outside of the pistol grip.
A semiautomatic shotgun that has two of the following:
A folding or telescoping stock.
A pistol grip that protrudes conspicuously beneath the action of the weapon.
A fixed magazine capacity in excess of 5 rounds 
The ability to accept a detachable magazine.
Any shotgun with a revolving cylinder.

Machine gun license
A license to possess or carry a machine gun may be issued only to a firearm instructor certified by the Criminal Justice Training Council for the sole purpose of firearm instruction to police personnel, or to a bona fide collector of firearms upon application or renewal of such license. 

A "bona fide collector of firearms," for the purpose of issuance of a machine gun license, shall be defined as an individual who acquires firearms for such lawful purposes as historical significance, display, research, lecturing, demonstration, test firing, investment or other like purpose.

For the purpose of issuance of a machine gun license, the acquisition of firearms for sporting use or for use as an offensive or defensive weapon shall not qualify an applicant as a bona fide collector of firearms.

The state has an assault weapons ban similar to the expired Federal ban. Massachusetts is a "may issue", as such the LTC-A is issued in a discretionary manner.

Travelers and firearms
While Massachusetts' firearms laws are some of the most strict in the United States, they are not applicable to travelers who comply with the Firearm Owners Protection Act's traveler's exemption.

Firearm storage
Unless carried or under the control of the owner, state law requires all firearms to be stored in a locked container, or equipped with a tamper-resistant mechanical lock or other safety device (see trigger lock), properly engaged so as to render such weapon inoperable by any person other than the owner or other lawfully authorized user. If in a vehicle, firearm must be unloaded and contained within the locked trunk of such vehicle or in a locked case or other secure container, unless the licensee has a Class A license, in which case the firearm must be under the licensee's direct control. Any firearms that are found to be unsecured may be confiscated by law enforcement officers and license may be revoked. Violation of this act (MGL c. 140, Section 131L) is punishable "by a fine of not less than $2,000 nor more than $15,000 or by imprisonment for not less than 1 1/2 years nor more than 12 years or by both such fine and imprisonment."

In the event a license is revoked for any reason, law enforcement will confiscate all weapons and store them for 1 year before destroying or selling them unless the revoked licensee transfers ownership to a properly licensed party who then claims the firearms. 

There is no penalty under the law for police authorities who fail to abide by the statute, however, and many police departments have effectively nullified the 1 year requirement in practice, effectively turning this holding period in which the owner can transfer these firearms into outright confiscation.  This is accomplished by improperly selling the firearms to a dealer, or by placing the firearms into storage facilities that charge storage fees so high as to make retrieving the weapons prohibitive, then making no effort to inform the weapon owner of these fees. Within a short time the weapons are then sold by the storage facility to pay costs, the police department receiving some money in return. Efforts to sue police departments for damages have been rejected by the courts there is no private right of action under Mass. Gen. Laws ch. 140, § 129D (see Mirsky v. Barkas, 2011 WL 2371879, at *5-6 (Mass. Super. Ct. Jan. 31, 2011)). The plaintiff in the above entitled action showed that the Quincy Police willfully violated the statute after having brought civil action upon the restoration of his state license.

Also, gun license holders may encounter licensing issues when moving from one town to another.  While one city or town police chief may have issued a license, the chief of police in the city or town where the license holder may move does not have to authorize it, and may require that guns be surrendered.  If a gun license is not authorized, and the police determine that the resident also holds a license in a different state, they may contact law enforcement in that state and inform them of the action, which could lead to the loss of the out-of-state license as well.

Non-citizen permits
Non-citizens who reside in Massachusetts can apply for a "permit to possess non-large-capacity rifles and shotguns pursuant M.G.L. 140 s. 131H" directly with the Massachusetts Firearms Record Bureau. The applicants must receive firearms education at the FID or LTC-level and pass a 20-fingerprint FBI background check and interview. This permit is a "may issue" document similar to the FID but expiring December 31 of each year. The procedure requires about 16 weeks from application to delivery of the permit. There is no 90-day grace period for the renewal of non-citizens permits. Both nonresident (i.e. visa-holders) and permanent resident (i.e. green-card holders) non-citizens are lumped together by Massachusetts law. The non-citizens permit allows the possession of non-high capacity (10 rounds or less) shotguns, rifles, and ammunition. This includes .22 caliber rifles with tubular magazines holding more than 10 rounds, but it excludes high capacity rifles, assault rifles, and handguns. FID and LTC are generally not issued to non-citizens even though Massachusetts law grants some latitude  to the Colonel of Massachusetts State Police, who may be petitioned directly. A recent lawsuit, Fletcher v. Haas, has expanded Massachusetts non-citizens' gun rights by allowing possession and purchase of handguns for permanent resident non-citizens (green card holders). non-citizens permits are still in existence and required for all non-permanent resident non-citizens in Massachusetts.

As of April 30, 2012, all lawful permanent resident non-citizens (green card holders) are eligible to apply for a Massachusetts resident license to carry ("LTC") or firearms identification card ("FID").

Other laws
Massachusetts enacted a red flag law in 2018.  A judge may issue an order to temporarily confiscate the firearms of a person who appears to be at risk of harming themselves or another person.  A hearing must be held within ten days of the order being issued.  At the hearing, if there is sufficient evidence to substantiate the risk, the person's firearms may be confiscated for up to one year (The owner's weapons may still be disposed of in violation of the act, see above on Storage). However, one is not subject to filing or issuing for a permit of a muzzle loader which is considered primitive arms. So a muzzleloader may not be on record. However, one still must be of age to own the muzzleloader.

See also
 Law of Massachusetts

References

Massachusetts law
Massachusetts